Arsonic acid is the simplest of the arsonic acids.  It is a hypothetical compound, although the tautomeric arsenious acid (As(OH)3) is well established.  In contrast to the instability of HAsO(OH)2, the phosphorus compound with analogous stoichiometry exists as the tetrahedral tautomer.  Similarly, organic derivatives such as phenylarsonic acid are tetrahedral with pentavalent central atom.

There are similar acids that are the same except for having different pnictogens. The phosphorus equivalent is phosphonic acid.

References 

Arsonic acids
Hypothetical chemical compounds